Pascal Ochieng (born 15 May 1986 in Kenya) is a Kenyan international footballer, currently playing for Simba.

Pascal Ochieng had a short stint at Gor Mahia FC in 2005 and AFC Leopards  2011 mid season before joining Simba in 2012. He plays for Posta Rangers and is captain of the Division one team that the chance to join the KPL league after drawing 2-2 with promoted KRA before losing 6-5 on penalty shoot outs. Ochieng converted the first for his team.

On 13 August, Simba have settled for a signature of Kenya's Harambee Stars Vice captain and defender Pascal Ochieng.

International career

International goals
Scores and results list Kenya's goal tally first.

References

External links
 
 
 

1986 births
Living people
Kenyan footballers
Expatriate footballers in Malaysia
Young Africans S.C. players
Kenya international footballers
Brabrand IF players
Nairobi City Stars players
Association football central defenders
Tanzanian Premier League players